The Chelsea Street Bridge is a vertical-lift bridge that carries Chelsea Street between East Boston, Massachusetts, and Chelsea, Massachusetts, over the Chelsea Creek. It opened to traffic on May 12, 2012, after a $125.3M construction project replaced the previous bridge, a single-leaf bascule-type drawbridge. There are two lanes and a sidewalk in each direction.

Previous bridges
The current bridge is the latest in a succession of bridges at the same site going back to 1834. The most recent predecessor was a single-leaf bascule bridge on which construction began in 1936 and which was opened on May 10, 1937.

Silver Line issues

The Chelsea Street Bridge is used by the MBTA Silver Line SL3 route, which began service in April 2018. Frequent openings of the bridge — as many as ten per day — have caused numerous delays. Ships and barges carry petroleum products to tank farms upstream from the bridge and each delivery can cause at least two bridge openings as tug boats come and go. Federal regulations give priority to marine traffic and require the bridge to be opened on demand.

See also
List of bridges documented by the Historic American Engineering Record in Massachusetts

References

External links

Bridges in Boston
Chelsea, Massachusetts
Bridges in Suffolk County, Massachusetts
Historic American Engineering Record in Massachusetts
Vertical lift bridges in Massachusetts